Ruth Schmid is a Swiss orienteering competitor. She won a bronze medal in the relay at the World Orienteering Championships in 1981, together with Annelies Meier, Irene Bucher and Ruth Humbel.

References

Year of birth missing (living people)
Living people
Swiss orienteers
Female orienteers
Foot orienteers
World Orienteering Championships medalists